Agonum canadense is a species of ground beetle in the Platyninae subfamily that can be found in Ontario, Canada and Pennsylvania, United States.

References

Beetles described in 1969
Beetles of North America
canadense
Fauna of Canada
Fauna without expected TNC conservation status